Thomas Mifflin School is a historic school located in the East Falls neighborhood of Philadelphia, Pennsylvania. It is part of the School District of Philadelphia. The building was designed by Irwin T. Catharine and built in 1936. It is a -story, "L"-shaped, brick building on a raised basement in the Colonial Revival-style. Additions were built in 1966 and 1968. It features a large brick and wood clock tower, gable roof, and rounded gables. The school was named for American merchant and politician Thomas Mifflin (1744–1800).

The building was added to the National Register of Historic Places in 1988.

References

External links
Thomas Mifflin School
 at School District of Philadelphia

School buildings on the National Register of Historic Places in Philadelphia
Colonial Revival architecture in Pennsylvania
School buildings completed in 1936
East Falls, Philadelphia
School District of Philadelphia
Public K–8 schools in Philadelphia